Tayutama: Kiss on my Deity is a 2009 anime series based on the visual novel of the same name. Produced by Silver Link and directed by Keitaro Motonaga, the series aired 12 episodes between April 5 and June 21, 2009. The series was released in Japan over six BD/DVD compilation volumes with two episodes per volume between June 25, 2009, and November 25, 2009. Sentai Filmworks licensed the anime for distribution by Section23 Films in North America, and the series was released as a volume of two DVDs on March 16, 2010.

Episode list

References

External links
Anime's official website 

Lists of anime episodes

ja:タユタマ -Kiss on my Deity-
zh:遊魂 -Kiss on my Deity-